New York News is an American newspaper drama television series created by Michelle Ashford, which was broadcast in the United States by CBS from September 28 to November 30, 1995 as part of its 1995 fall lineup.

Cast 
 Gregory Harrison as Jack Reilly
 Melina Kanakaredes as Angela Villanova
 Madeline Kahn as Nan Chase
 Kelli Williams as Ellie
 Anthony DeSando as Tony Amato
 Kevin Chamberlin as Victor
 Joe Morton as Mitch Cotter
 Mary Tyler Moore as Louise Felcott

Premise 
New York News is the story of the fictional New York Reporter, a struggling tabloid in the US's largest, most competitive newspaper market, New York City. Major characters included Jack Reilly (Gregory Harrison), an old-style newspaperman (so old-style that he actually went sneaking around in a trench coat); Angela Villanova (Melina Kanakaredes), a young writer who seemingly alternated between admiring Reilly and being in love with him; Nan Chase (Madeline Kahn), a gossip columnist somewhat in the vein of Rona Barrett; and Tony Amato (Anthony DeSando), the paper's leading sports columnist.

Supervising all of these talented, high-strung people was Editor-in-Chief Louise Felcott (Mary Tyler Moore), the "Dragon", who kept the pressure up on these employees and others, including their immediate boss, Managing Editor Mitch Cotter (Joe Morton). The paper's budget cutting and the related attempt of ownership to sell it took their toll on Cotter, who suffered a minor heart attack in the early episodes.

Moore was reportedly very unhappy with how her character was written, as a tough, unsympathetic, and unglamourous woman who peered out at her subordinates through thick "Coke-bottle" glasses. She was reputedly in negotiations to get out of her contract to do the program when this was made unnecessary by CBS's cancellation of it due to low Nielsen ratings two months after its premiere.

Episode list

Nielsen ratings

References 
 Brooks, Tim and Marsh, Earle, The Complete Directory to Prime Time Network and Cable TV Shows

External links 

Pages with unreviewed translations
CBS original programming
1995 American television series debuts
1995 American television series endings
Television series about journalism
Television series by Warner Bros. Television Studios
Television shows set in New York City